This is a list of species of plants and animals protected by Appendix II of the Convention on International Trade in Endangered Species of Wild Fauna and Flora, commonly abbreviated as CITES.  There are no fungi listed in any appendix.

List of species protected by CITES Appendix I
List of species protected by CITES Appendix III

Appendix II

Abronia spp. [except the species included in Appendix I (zero export quota for wild specimens for Abronia aurita, Abronia gaiophantasma, Abronia montecristoi, Abronia salvadorensis and Abronia vasconcelosii)
Acerodon spp. (Except the species included in Appendix I)
Aceros spp. (Except the species included in Appendix I)
Acipenseriformes spp. (Except the species included in Appendix I)
Adansonia grandidieri
Adelphobates spp.
Adenia firingalavensis
Adenia olaboensis
Adenia subsessilifolia
Adonis vernalis
Agalychnis spp.
Agave victoriae-reginae
Allobates femoralis
Allobates hodli
Allobates myersi
Allobates zaparo
Aloe spp. (Except the species included in Appendix I. Also excludes Aloe vera, also referenced as Aloe barbadensis which is not included in the Appendices)
Alopias spp. (entry into effect delayed until 4 October 2017)
Amandava formosa
Amblyrhynchus cristatus
Ambystoma dumerilii
Ambystoma mexicanum
Ameerega spp.
Ammotragus lervia
Amyda cartilaginea
Anacampseros spp.
Anas bernieri
Anas formosa
Andinobates spp.
Anguilla anguilla
Aniba rosaeodora
Anomaloglossus rufulus
Anorrhinus spp.
Anthracoceros spp.
Antipatharia spp. "Black corals"
Aphonopelma albiceps
Aphonopelma pallidum
Aquilaria spp.
Arapaima gigas
Archaius spp.
Arctocephalus spp. (Except the species included in Appendix I)
Argusianus argus
Atheris desaixi
Atrophaneura jophon
Atrophaneura pandiyana
Avonia spp.
Balaeniceps rex
Batagur borneoensis (Zero quota for wild specimens for commercial purposes)
Batagur dhongoka
Batagur kachuga
Batagur trivittata (Zero quota for wild specimens for commercial purposes)
Beaucarnea spp.
Beccariophoenix madagascariensis
Berenicornis spp.
Bhutanitis spp.
Bitis worthingtoni
Boidae spp. (Except the species included in Appendix I)
Bolyeriidae spp. (Except the species included in Appendix I)
Bowenia spp.
Brachypelma spp.
Bradypodion spp.
Bradypus pygmaeus
Bradypus variegatus
Branta ruficollis
Brookesia spp. (Except the species included in Appendix I)
Buceros spp. (Except the species included in Appendix I)
Budorcas taxicolor
Bulnesia sarmientoi
Cactaceae spp. (Except the species included in Appendix I and except Pereskia spp., Pereskiopsis spp. and Quiabentia spp.)
Caecobarbus geertsii
Caesalpinia echinata
Calumma spp.
Canis lupus (Except the populations of Bhutan, India, Nepal and Pakistan, which are included in Appendix I. Excludes the domesticated form, Canis lupus familiaris, and the dingo, Canis lupus dingo, which are not subject to the provisions of the Convention)
Capra caucasica
Carcharhinus falciformis (entry into effect delayed until 4 October 2017)
Carcharhinus longimanus
Carcharodon carcharias
Carduelis yarrellii
Carettochelys insculpta
Caryocar costaricense
Cephalophus brookei
Cephalophus dorsalis
Cephalophus ogilbyi
Cephalophus silvicultor
Cephalophus zebra
Ceratotherium simum simum (Only the populations of South Africa and Eswatini; all other populations are included in Appendix I. For the exclusive purpose of allowing international trade in live animals to appropriate and acceptable destinations and hunting trophies. All other specimens shall be deemed to be specimens of species included in Appendix I and the trade in them shall be regulated accordingly)
Cerdocyon thous
Cervus elaphus bactrianus
Cetacea spp. (Except the species included in Appendix I. A zero annual export quota has been established for live specimens from the Black Sea population of Tursiops truncatus removed from the wild and traded for primarily commercial purposes)
Cetorhinus maximus
Chaetophractus nationi (A zero annual export quota has been established. All specimens shall be deemed to be specimens of species included in Appendix I and the trade in them shall be regulated accordingly)
Chamaeleo spp.
Cheilinus undulatus
Chelodina mccordi (Zero export quota for specimens from the wild)
Chitra spp. (Except the species included in Appendix I)
Choeropsis liberiensis 
Chrysocyon brachyurus
Cibotium barometz
Ciconia nigra
Cistanche deserticola
Clelia clelia
Clemmys guttata
Conepatus humboldtii
Conolophus spp.
Cordylus spp.
Corucia zebrata
Coscoroba coscoroba
Crocodilurus amazonicus
Crocodylia spp. (Except the species included in Appendix I)
Cryptoprocta ferox
Ctenosaura bakeri
Ctenosaura melanosterna
Ctenosaura oedirhina
Ctenosaura palearis
Cuon alpinus
Cuora spp. (Zero quota for wild specimens for commercial purposes for Cuora aurocapitata, C. bourreti, C. flavomarginata, C. galbinifrons, C. mccordi, C. mouhotii, C. pani, C. picturata, C. trifasciata, C. yunnanensis and C. zhoui)
Cyathea spp.
Cycadaceae spp. (Except the species included in Appendix I)
Cyclagras gigas
Cyclamen spp.
Cyclanorbis elegans
Cyclanorbis senegalensis
Cyclemys spp.
Cycloderma aubryi
Cycloderma frenatum
Cygnus melancoryphus
Cynogale bennettii
Cyornis ruckii
Cyphostemma elephantopus
Cyphostemma laza
Cyphostemma montagnacii
Cyprogenia aberti
Dalbergia spp. (except for the species listed in Appendix I)
Damaliscus pygargus pygargus
Dendrobates spp.
Dendrocygna arborea
Dendrolagus inustus
Dendrolagus ursinus
Dermatemys mawii
Dicksonia spp. (Only the populations of the Americas; no other population is included in the Appendices)
Didiereaceae spp.
Dionaea muscipula
Dioscorea deltoidea
Diospyros spp. (Populations of Madagascar)
Dogania subplana
Dracaena spp. "caiman lizards" or "water tegu"
Dynastes satanas
Dypsis decaryi
Dyscophus antongilii
Dyscophus guineti
Dyscophus insularis
Elachistodon westermanni
Emydoidea blandingii
Epioblasma torulosa rangiana
Epipedobates spp.
Equus hemionus (Except the subspecies included in Appendix I)
Equus kiang
Equus zebra hartmannae
Equus zebra zebra
Erymnochelys madagascariensis
Eudocimus ruber
Euphlyctis hexadactylus
Euphorbia spp.(Succulent species only except Euphorbia misera and the species included in Appendix I. Artificially propagated specimens of cultivars of Euphorbia trigona, artificially propagated specimens of crested, fan-shaped or colour mutants of Euphorbia lactea, when grafted on artificially propagated root stock of Euphorbia neriifolia, and artificially propagated specimens of cultivars of Euphorbia ‘Milii’ when they are traded in shipments of 100 or more plants and readily recognizable as artificially propagated specimens, are not subject to the provisions of the Convention)
Eupleres goudotii
Excidobates spp.
Falconiformes spp. (Except Caracara lutosa and the species of the family Cathartidae, which are not included in the Appendices; and the species included in Appendix I and III)
Felidae spp. (Except the species included in Appendix I. Excludes specimens of the domesticated form, which are not subject to the provisions of the Convention. For Panthera leo (African populations): a zero annual export quota is established for specimens of bones, bone pieces, bone products, claws, skeletons, skulls and teeth removed from the wild and traded for commercial purposes. Annual export quotas for trade in bones, bone pieces, bone products, claws, skeletons, skulls and teeth for commercial purposes, derived from captive breeding operations in South Africa, will be established and communicated annually to the CITES Secretariat.)
Fossa fossana
Fouquieria columnaris
Furcifer spp.
Galanthus spp.
Gallicolumba luzonica
Gallus sonneratii
Garrulax canorus
Garrulax taewanus
Geoemyda japonica
Geoemyda spengleri
Geronticus calvus
Glyptemys insculpta
Gonystylus spp.
Goura spp. "crowned pigeons"
Gracula religiosa
Gruidae spp. (Except the species included in Appendix I)
Guaiacum spp.
Gubernatrix cristata
Guibourtia demeusei
Guibourtia pellegriniana
Guibourtia tessmannii
Gyrinops spp.
Hardella thurjii
Hedychium philippinense
Helioporidae spp. (Includes only the species Heliopora coerulea. Fossils are not subject to the provisions of the Convention)
Heloderma spp. (Except the subspecies included in Appendix I)
Hemicordylus spp.
Hemigalus derbyanus
Heosemys annandalii (Zero quota for wild specimens for commercial purposes)
Heosemys depressa (Zero quota for wild specimens for commercial purposes)
Heosemys grandis
Heosemys spinosa
Hexaprotodon liberiensis
Hippocampus spp.
Hippopotamus amphibius
Hirudo medicinalis
Hirudo verbana
Holacanthus clarionensis
Hoodia spp.
Hoplobatrachus tigerinus
Hoplocephalus bungaroides
Hydrastis canadensis
Hyloxalus azureiventris
Iguana spp.
Ithaginis cruentus
Karusaurus spp.
Kinyongia spp.
Kobus leche
Lama guanicoe
Lamna nasus
Lanthanotidae spp. (Zero export quota for wild specimens for commercial purposes)
Leiothrix argentauris
Leiothrix lutea
Lemurophoenix halleuxii
Leucocephalon yuwonoi
Lewisia serrata
Lichenostomus melanops cassidix
Liocichla omeiensis
Lissemys ceylonensis
Lissemys punctata
Lissemys scutata
Lithophaga lithophaga
Lonchura oryzivora
Loxocemidae spp.
Loxodonta africana 2 (Only the populations of Botswana, Namibia, South Africa, and Zimbabwe; all other populations are included in Appendix I)
Lutrinae spp. (Except the species included in Appendix I)
Lycalopex culpaeus
Lycalopex fulvipes
Lycalopex griseus
Lycalopex gymnocercus
Malaclemys terrapin
Malayemys macrocephala
Malayemys subtrijuga
Manis spp. (Except the species included in Appendix I)
Manta spp. "manta rays"
Mantella spp.
Marojejya darianii
Mauremys annamensis (Zero quota for wild specimens for commercial purposes)
Mauremys japonica
Mauremys mutica
Mauremys nigricans
Melanochelys trijuga
Milleporidae spp. (Fossils are not subject to the provisions of the Convention)
Minyobates spp.
Mirounga leonina
Mobula spp.
Morenia petersi
Moschus spp. (Except the populations of Afghanistan, Bhutan, India, Myanmar, Nepal, and Pakistan, which are included in Appendix I)
Myrmecophaga tridactyla
Nactus serpensinsula
Nadzikambia spp.
Naja atra
Naja kaouthia
Naja mandalayensis
Naja naja
Naja oxiana
Naja philippinensis
Naja sagittifera
Naja samarensis
Naja siamensis
Naja sputatrix
Naja sumatrana
Namazonurus spp.
Nardostachys grandiflora
Naultinus spp.
Nautilidae spp.
Neoceratodus forsteri
Nepenthes spp. (Except the species included in Appendix I)
Nilssonia formosa
Nilssonia leithii
Ninurta spp.
Nolina interrata
Notochelys platynota
Oophaga spp.
Operculicarya decaryi
Operculicarya hyphaenoides
Operculicarya pachypus
Ophiophagus hannah
Orchidaceae spp. (Except the species included in Appendix I)
Oreomunnea pterocarpa
Orlitia borneensis (Zero quota for wild specimens for commercial purposes)
Ornithoptera spp. (Except the species included in Appendix I)
Osyris lanceolata (Populations of Burundi, Ethiopia, Kenya, Rwanda, Uganda, and Tanzania)
Otididae spp. (Except the species included in Appendix I)
Ouroborus spp.
Ovis ammon (Except the subspecies included in Appendix I)
Ovis aries (Except the subspecies included in Appendix I, the subspecies O. a. isphahanica, O. a. laristanica, O. a. musimon, and O. a. orientalis which are not included in the Appendices, and the domesticated form Ovis aries aries which is not subject to the provisions of the Convention)
Ovis canadensis (Only the population of Mexico; no other population is included in the Appendices)
Oxyura leucocephala
Pachypodium spp. (Except the species included in Appendix I)
Palea steindachneri
Palleon spp.
Panax ginseng (Only the population of the Russia; no other population is included in the Appendices)
Panax quinquefolius
Pandinus dictator
Pandinus gambiensis
Pandinus imperator
Pandinus roeseli
Pangshura spp. (Except the species included in Appendix I)
Papilio hospiton
Papustyla pulcherrima
Paradisaeidae spp.
Paramesotriton hongkongensis
Parnassius apollo
Paroaria capitata
Paroaria coronata
Paroedura masobe
Pavo muticus
Pelochelys spp.
Pelodiscus axenaria
Pelodiscus maackii
Pelodiscus parviformis
Peltocephalus dumerilianus
Penelopides spp.
Pericopsis elata
Phalanger intercastellanus
Phalanger mimicus
Phalanger orientalis
Phelsuma spp.
Philantomba monticola
Phoenicopteridae spp.
Phrynosoma blainvillii
Phrynosoma cerroense
Phrynosoma coronatum
Phrynosoma wigginsi
Phyllobates spp.
Picrorhiza kurrooa (Excludes Picrorhiza scrophulariiflora)
Pitta guajana
Pitta nympha
Platalea leucorodia
Platymiscium pleiostachyum
Pleurobema clava
Podarcis lilfordi
Podarcis pityusensis
Podocnemis spp.
Podophyllum hexandrum
Poephila cincta cincta
Polyplectron bicalcaratum
Polyplectron germaini
Polyplectron malacense
Polyplectron schleiermacheri
Primates spp. (Except the species included in Appendix I)
Prionodon linsang
Prunus africana
Pseudocordylus spp.
Psittaciformes spp. (Except the species included in Appendix I and Agapornis roseicollis, Melopsittacus undulatus, Nymphicus hollandicus, and Psittacula krameri, which are not included in the Appendices)
Pterocarpus erinaceus
Pterocarpus santalinus
Pterocnemia pennata pennata
Pteroglossus aracari
Pteroglossus viridis
Pteropus spp. (Except the species included in Appendix I and Pteropus brunneus)
Ptyas mucosus
Pudu mephistophiles
Pycnonotus zeylanicus
Pythonidae spp. (Except the subspecies included in Appendix I)
Rafetus euphraticus
Rafetus swinhoei
Ramphastos sulfuratus
Ramphastos toco
Ramphastos tucanus
Ramphastos vitellinus
Ranitomeya spp.
Ratufa spp.
Rauvolfia serpentina
Ravenea louvelii
Ravenea rivularis
Rhampholeon spp.
Rhea americana
Rheobatrachus spp. (Except Rheobatrachus silus and Rheobatrachus vitellinus which are not included in the Appendices)
Rhincodon typus
Rhoptropella spp.
Rhyticeros spp. (Except the species included in Appendix I)
Rieppeleon spp.
Rupicapra pyrenaica ornata
Rupicola spp.
Saara spp.
Sacalia bealei
Sacalia quadriocellata
Saiga borealis
Saiga tatarica
Salvator spp.
Sarkidiornis melanotos
Sarracenia spp. (Except the species included in Appendix I)
Satranala decussilvae
Scandentia spp.
Scaphiophryne boribory
Scaphiophryne gottlebei
Scaphiophryne marmorata
Scaphiophryne spinosa
Scleractinia spp. (Fossils are not subject to the provisions of the Convention)
Senna meridionalis
Siebenrockiella crassicollis
Siebenrockiella leytensis
Siphonochilus aethiopicus (Populations of Mozambique, South Africa, Eswatini, and Zimbabwe)
Smaug spp.
Spheniscus demersus
Sphyrna lewini
Sphyrna mokarran
Sphyrna zygaena
Spilocuscus kraemeri
Spilocuscus maculatus
Spilocuscus papuensis
Sternbergia spp.
Strigiformes spp. (Except the species included in Appendix I and Sceloglaux albifacies)
Strombus gigas
Stylasteridae spp. (Fossils are not subject to the provisions of the Convention)
Swietenia humilis
Swietenia macrophylla (Populations of the Neotropics)
Swietenia mahagoni
Tangara fastuosa
Tapirus terrestris
Tauraco spp.
Taxus chinensis and infraspecific taxa of this species
Taxus cuspidata and infraspecific taxa of this species
Taxus fuana (a synonym of Taxus contorta) and infraspecific taxa of this species
Taxus sumatrana and infraspecific taxa of this species
Taxus wallichiana
Tayassuidae spp. "peccaries" (Except the species included in Appendix I and the populations of Pecari tajacu of Mexico and the United States of America, which are not included in the Appendices)
Teinopalpus spp.
Terrapene spp. (Except the species included in Appendix I)
Testudinidae spp. (Except the species included in Appendix I. A zero annual export quota has been established for Centrochelys sulcata for specimens removed from the wild and traded for primarily commercial purposes)
Tillandsia harrisii
Tillandsia kammii
Tillandsia xerographica
Tridacnidae spp.
Trimeresurus mangshanensis
Trioceros spp.
Trionyx triunguis
Trochilidae spp. (Except the species included in Appendix I)
Trogonoptera spp.
Troides spp.
Tropidophiidae spp.
Tubiporidae spp. (Fossils are not subject to the provisions of the Convention)
Tupinambis spp.
Tympanuchus cupido attwateri
Uncarina grandidieri
Uncarina stellulifera
Uromastyx spp.
Uroplatus spp.
Ursidae spp. (Except the species included in Appendix I)
Varanus spp. (Except the species included in Appendix I)
Vicugna vicugna (Only the populations of Argentina (the populations of the Provinces of Jujuy and Catamarca and the semi-captive populations of the Provinces of Jujuy, Salta, Catamarca, La Rioja and San Juan), Chile (population of the Primera Región), Ecuador (the whole population), Peru (the whole population) and Bolivia (the whole population); all other populations are included in Appendix I)
Vijayachelys silvatica
Vipera wagneri
Voanioala gerardii
Vulpes cana
Vulpes zerda
Welwitschia mirabilis
Yucca queretaroensis
Zaglossus spp.
Zamiaceae spp. (Except the species included in Appendix I)
Zygosicyos pubescens
Zygosicyos tripartitus

References

External links

 Official CITES website
 Explanation of the Appendices
 Number of species on the Appendices
 Species lists (Appendices I, II and III)

Lists of biota by conservation status
Endangered species
Appendix II